Silver Star is Gary Glitter's fourth studio album, released in 1977.

It contained three hit singles, "It Takes All Night Long", "You Belong to Me" (released as a single on Bell 1473), and "A Little Boogie Woogie in the Back of My Mind" (the latter of which was a hit twice, thanks to a cover version by Shakin' Stevens in the 1980s).

Other selections include Gary's version of "Rock 'N' Roll (I Gave You the Best Years of My Life)" (a previous hit for its writer, Kevin Johnson), a rock number "Summertime Blues Out", the good time boogie track "Heartbreaking Blue Eyed Boy", a tribute to the world's entertainment capital, "Hooked on Hollywood", as well as the fan favourite "Oh What a Fool I Have Been".

The album fused rock n' roll and disco and was designed to expand Glitter's fan base, especially in the United States, where he had hit with "Rock and Roll" several years previously. However, sales were disappointing and it failed to chart inside the all important Top 50 on either side of the Atlantic. Nevertheless, it went on to become a classic amongst his loyal fan base and was even voted the number one album of his career by his fan club in 1996.

Track listing

References

Gary Glitter albums
1977 albums
Arista Records albums